Tredodridge (also Tre-Dodridge)  is a hamlet in the Vale of Glamorgan within Wales in the United Kingdom. It lies along a country lane, to the northwest of Pendoylan and southwest of Clawddcoch. It contains Brynteg House, rumoured to once be occupied by James Somerset (The house however was built over 100 years after he came to the country). To the northwest of the hamlet is the Vale of Glamorgan Golf Club and Hensol Castle.

References

Villages in the Vale of Glamorgan